Alf Large (March 4, 1918 – January 28, 2007) was a Norwegian bobsledder who competed in the late 1940s. He finished fifth in the four-man event at the 1948 Winter Olympics, in St. Moritz.

References
1948 bobsleigh four-man results
Alf Large's profile at Sports Reference.com

Olympic bobsledders of Norway
Bobsledders at the 1948 Winter Olympics
Norwegian male bobsledders
1918 births
2007 deaths